An attic is an area under the roof of a house.

Attic may also refer to:

Attica-related 
 The adjectival form of the word Attica, a historical region that encompasses the city of Athens
 Attic Greek, a dialect of the Greek language spoken in ancient Athens
 The ten Attic orators, ancient Athenian speechwriters
 The Attic peninsula, another name for Attica
 Attic (architecture), a story or low wall above the cornice of a façade in classical architecture.

Other uses 
 Apache Attic, a repository for Apache Software Foundation software projects that have been retired
 Attic (backup software)
 Attic Entertainment Software, a defunct German computer game developer and publisher
 Attic (or atticus), is the epitympanic recess of the middle ear
 Attic Records (Canada), a record label

See also 
 The Attic (disambiguation)
 ATIC (disambiguation)
 Attik (1885–1944), Greek composer
 Atiq, Arabic name